The Cat Funeral is a 2015 South Korean film written, directed and produced by Lee Jong-hoon, based on the webtoon of the same name by Hong.

Plot
Indie musician Dong-hoon and cartoonist Jae-hee broke up a year ago. The former couple meet again after the death of the cat they owned together, and go on a night's trip to hold a funeral for their pet.

Cast
Kangin as Dong-hoon  
Park Se-young as Jae-hee
Jung Gyu-woon as Hyeon-seok
Hong Wan-pyo as Jin-hyeok
Kim Byeong-choon as Dong-hoon's father
Cha Min-ji as Eun-kyeong

References

External links
 

The Cat Funeral webtoon at Daum 

2015 films
South Korean romantic drama films
Films about cats
Films based on South Korean webtoons
Live-action films based on comics
2010s South Korean films